Bangaon is a municipality in North 24 Parganas district of West Bengal, India.

Bangaon may also refer to:

West Bengal
Bangaon (community development block)
Bangaon (Lok Sabha constituency)
Bangaon Uttar (Vidhan Sabha constituency)
Bangaon Dakshin (Vidhan Sabha constituency)
Bongaon High School, a higher secondary school at Bangaon
Bangaon railway station, a railway station of Bangaon
Bangaon subdivision

Others
Bangaon (Kamrup), Assam, India
Bangaon, Bihar, a  village in the Saharsa district of Bihar, India
Bangaon, Lucknow, a village in Uttar Pradesh, India
Bongram, a village in the Gopalganj District, Bangladesh